Rentokill may refer to:

Rentokil Initial, a pest control company
Rentokill (band), an Austrian punk band